The peerage of France consists of the great officers, direct vassals of the Crown of France, with the title peer of France. They represent the primitive constituents of elective monarchy, before the succession became hereditary in the House of Capet.

Primitive peers 

They were probably, at the time of the Frankish monarchy, the great princes and vassals who were called to choose a successor to king among the eligible princes to the crown.

Since 1180, they were responsible for ensuring the succession and were involved in the ceremony of coronation where each represents a symbolic function of the nomination.

Ecclesiastical peers

Lay Peers

Later peerages

Peerages created in the 13th century
In 1297, Philip IV of France created three new peerages, to replace some of the lay peerages which had merged into the crown (Normandy and Toulouse; while Champagne was held by Philip IV's wife, Joan I of Navarre). All three new peerages were created for nobles of Capetian descent.

Peerages created in the 14th century 
Peerages created in the 14th century were for princes of the royal blood, most of which were for the Valois princes. One was created for the Count of Flanders.

Peerages created in the 15th century 
In the fifteenth century, Charles VII began granting peerages to foreigners, to his Scottish allies in particular.

Peerages created in the 16th century

Peerages created in the 17th century

Peerages created in the 18th century 

In 1789, there were 43 peers of which 6 were princes of the blood.

Peerages created in the 19th century 
From 1814 to 1830 the number of peers increased from 154 to 365.

Notes and references

See also 
Peerage of France
List of French peerages
List of French peers
List of French dukedoms

Sources and Bibliography 
 Duchés-Pairies, Duchés et Pairies français sous l'Ancien Régime sur www.heraldique-europeenne.org
 Maisons ducales ou titulaires de Pairies sous l'Ancien Régime sur www.heraldique-europeenne.org
 Vincent Albouy, 
 Neubecker. Héraldique
 Louda. Europe
 GenHeral.com
 (http://memodoc.com)
 Annuaire de la noblesse de France et des maisons souveraines de l'Europe 1843 à 1880
 Recueil d'armoiries des maisons nobles de France by Nicolas Jules Henri Gourdon de Genouillac 1860
 Pierre Paul Dubuisson. Armorial des principales maisons et familles du royaume, de Paris et de l'Île de France

France
 
French
 
Peers